Borderline is a 1930 film, written and directed by Kenneth Macpherson and produced by the Pool Group in Territet, Switzerland. The silent film, with English inter-titles, is primarily noted for its handling of the contentious issue of inter-racial relationships, using avant-garde experimental film-making techniques, and is today very much part of the curriculum of the study of modern cinematography.

The film, which features Paul Robeson, Eslanda Robeson, Bryher and H.D., was originally believed to have been lost, but was discovered, by chance, in Switzerland in 1983. An original 16mm copy of this film is now held in the Donnell Media Center, New York City Public Library. In 2006, the British Film Institute sponsored the film's restoration by The George Eastman House and eventual DVD release with a soundtrack, composed by Courtney Pine. Its premiere at the Tate Modern gallery in London attracted 2,000 people. In 2010, the film was released with a soundtrack composed by Mallory Johns, and performed by the Southern Connecticut State University Creative Music Orchestra.

Cast
 Paul Robeson as Pete Marond (an African-American)
 Eslanda Robeson as Adah (Pete's wife)
 Gavin Arthur as Thorne
 Helga Doorn (HD) as Astrid (Thorn's wife)
 Bryher as The Manageress
 Charlotte Arthur as The Barmaid
 Robert Herring as The Pianist
 Blanche Lewin as The Old Lady

Plot
The film revolves around an inter-racial love triangle and its effects on the local townsfolk. The story is based in a guesthouse occupied by a set of liberal, hedonistic young people sympathetic to the emerging black American culture. In what would have been completely frowned upon at the time, the manageress has let out a room to a black couple, Pete Marond and his wife Adah.

Adah has an affair with Thorne, a white man, much to the dismay of the prejudiced townsfolk and Thorne's wife Astrid. Pete attempts a reconciliation with Adah, but she eventually decides to leave him and the town. Astrid confronts Thorne on the affair and attacks him with a knife. In the scuffle, Astrid is killed. The film concludes with the aftermath of Thorne's trial for murder and the townsfolk's resolution of the issue.

Cinematic techniques
Macpherson was particularly influenced by the cinematic techniques of G.W. Pabst and Sergei Eisenstein, whom he first met in 1929. In Borderline, he uses avant-garde, experimental film-making techniques, blending Eisenstein’s montage innovation and Pabst’s psycho-analytical approach, to identify the emotional and psychological states of the film’s characters. These techniques called for unconventional post-production editing, the use of light and shadow, and exaggerated movement on the part of the actors. "Macpherson’s brilliance lies in his ability to photograph small movements as nuanced, meaning-producing gestures".

"Taking heed from the Soviet montage school of thought, Macpherson incites action and reaction through a bravura demonstration of editing that willfully distorts the viewer’s grasp of his visual rhetoric. The film bemuses with its expeditious cutting rates and its excisional framing – the latter’s reduction of human figures to dissected body parts powerfully accentuating the characters’ physical detachment from their internal desires. Together, these core tenets invoke an overwhelming tsunami of kineticism that obliterates the audience's understanding of the film's  and temporal dimensions until all that's left for us to cling to is an immediate, raw visceralism; the ultimate purification of the cinematic experience."

Conclusion
"Judged on its own merits, Borderline is a ground-breaking work, dealing as it does with issues of race and sexuality at a time when such subject matter was still largely taboo and had only been previously tackled cinematically through oblique inference". It was decades before the cinematic community addressed the subject matter raised in Borderline. At the time of its release, Borderline was a film that confused and bewildered critics leading Clive MacManus of the London Evening Standard to advise Macpherson "to spend a year in a commercial studio" before attempting something as difficult again. Deeply upset by its hostile reception, Macpherson archived his film and withdrew from film directing. Macpherson’s work influenced film-makers such as Nathaniel Dorsky and Robert Beavers.

Film and legacy details
For many years, Borderline was largely inaccessible to film scholars, with rare copies in a few archives around the world. It was seldom screened in public. Many film historians of avant garde and experimental film-making, feel that it represents one of the last examples of modernism of the 1920s, when many artists had hoped that artistic experimentation and commercial viability need not be mutually exclusive.

An anonymous libretto, 'The Borderline Pamphlet', credited to H.D., was written to accompany  –  and explain  –  the film.

Notes

Further reading
 Debo, Annette (2001). 'Interracial Modernism in Avant-Garde Film: Paul Robeson and H.D. in the 1930 Borderline,' Quarterly Review of Film & Video, Vol. 18(4): 371-383. doi.org/10.1080/10509200109361537
Friedberg, Anne (1983) 'Writing about Cinema: Close Up, 1927-1933,'''  Unpublished PhD thesis, New York University. http://www.nyu.edu/projects/wke/dissertationsSite/indices/phd_graduates/friedberg_anne.php
 
Philip, Fiona (2008) 'Veiled Disclosures and "Speaking Back": Borderline (1930) and the presence of censorship' in Davy, Z., Downes, J., Eckert, L, Gerodetti, N., Llinares, D., and Santos, A. C. (eds), Bound and Unbound: Interdisciplinary approaches to genders and sexualities. Newcastle: Cambridge Scholars Publishing, 2008.
Walton, Jean (1999). 'White Neurotics, Black Primitives and the Queer Matrix of Borderline,' in Hansen, E. (Ed.) Out Takes.'' Durham, NC: Duke UP, 1999, pp. 244–270.

External links
 

1930 films
1930 drama films
Bisexuality-related films
British black-and-white films
British avant-garde and experimental films
British drama films
British LGBT-related films
British silent feature films
Films about race and ethnicity
Paul Robeson
Swiss silent films
1930s rediscovered films
1930s LGBT-related films
1930s avant-garde and experimental films
Swiss black-and-white films
Rediscovered Swiss films
1930s British films
Silent drama films